Cătălin Anghel (born 4 October 1974) is a former Romanian footballer and current assistant coach of Liga I club Farul Constanța.

Club career
Anghel played for his native club Farul Constanța. He joined Ukrainian First League side FC Stal Alchevsk during the 2003–04 season, and helped the club reach the quarter-finals of the Ukrainian Cup. He then moved to Hungary playing for BVSC Budapest and Kaposvári Rákóczi.

Coaching career
After his retirement he worked as head coach for CSO Ovidiu and Viitorul Constanța.

Honours

Coach
Viitorul Constanța
Liga III: 2009–10

References

Sportspeople from Constanța
1974 births
Living people
Romanian footballers
Association football midfielders
FCV Farul Constanța players
Budapesti VSC footballers
Kaposvári Rákóczi FC players
FC Stal Alchevsk players
FC Irtysh Pavlodar players
Romanian expatriate footballers
Expatriate footballers in Hungary
Expatriate footballers in Ukraine
Expatriate footballers in Kazakhstan
Romanian expatriate sportspeople in Hungary
Romanian expatriate sportspeople in Ukraine
Liga I players
Nemzeti Bajnokság I players
Romanian football managers
FC Viitorul Constanţa managers
Association football forwards